The 2018 Swiss Open, officially the Yonex Swiss Open 2018, was a badminton tournament which took place at St. Jakobshalle in Switzerland from 20 to 25 February 2018 and had a total purse of $150,000.

Tournament
The 2018 Swiss Open was the fifth tournament of the 2018 BWF World Tour and also part of the Swiss Open championships which had been held since 1955. This tournament was organized by Swiss Badminton with the sanction of the BWF.

Venue
This international tournament was held at St. Jakobshalle in Basel, Switzerland.

Point distribution
Below is a table with the point distribution for each phase of the tournament based on the BWF points system for the BWF World Tour Super 300 event.

Prize money
The total prize money for this tournament was US$150,000. Distribution of prize money was in accordance with BWF regulations.

Men's singles

Seeds

 Rajiv Ouseph (second round)
 Sameer Verma (champion)
 Ygor Coelho de Oliveira (first round)
 Suppanyu Avihingsanon (quarterfinals)
 Mark Caljouw (second round)
 Emil Holst (first round)
 Rasmus Gemke (withdrew)
 Lee Zii Jia (first round)

Finals

Top half

Section 1

Section 2

Bottom half

Section 3

Section 4

Women's singles

Seeds

 Sayaka Takahashi (champion)
 Minatsu Mitani (semifinals)
 Mia Blichfeldt (second round)
 Evgeniya Kosetskaya (semifinals)
 Beatriz Corrales (quarterfinals)
 Linda Zetchiri (quarterfinals)
 Line Kjærsfeldt (quarterfinals)
 Natalia Koch Rohde (quarterfinals)

Finals

Top half

Section 1

Section 2

Bottom half

Section 3

Section 4

Men's doubles

Seeds

 Mathias Boe / Carsten Mogensen (champions)
 Mathias Christiansen / David Daugaard (second round)
 Marcus Ellis / Chris Langridge (semifinals)
 Josche Zurwonne / Jones Ralfy Jansen (second round)
 Manu Attri / B. Sumeeth Reddy (withdrew)
 Peter Briggs / Tom Wolfenden (second round)
 Jacco Arends / Ruben Jille (first round)
 Mark Lamsfuß / Marvin Emil Seidel (second round)

Finals

Top half

Section 1

Section 2

Bottom half

Section 3

Section 4

Women's doubles

Seeds

 Gabriela Stoeva / Stefani Stoeva (final)
 Olga Morozova / Anastasia Chervyakova (second round)
 Sara Thygesen / Maiken Fruergaard (first round)
 Misato Aratama / Akane Watanabe (second round)

Finals

Top half

Section 1

Section 2

Bottom half

Section 3

Section 4

Mixed doubles

Seeds

 Mark Lamsfuß / Isabel Herttrich (champions)
 Ronan Labar / Audrey Fontaine (withdrew)
 Sam Magee / Chloe Magee (withdrew)
 Marvin Emil Seidel / Linda Efler (quarterfinals)
 Jacco Arends / Selena Piek (quarterfinals)
 Ben Lane / Jessica Pugh (semifinals)
 Marcus Ellis / Lauren Smith (final)
 Mikkel Mikkelsen / Mai Surrow (quarterfinals)

Finals

Top half

Section 1

Section 2

Bottom half

Section 3

Section 4

References

External links
 Tournament Link
 Official Website

Swiss Open (badminton)
Swiss Open
Open (badminton)
Swiss Open (badminton)